Ricci Hall is a hall of residence founded in 1929 by the Society of Jesus in memory of Jesuit Matteo Ricci (1552–1610). Located at 93 Pok Fu Lam Road, Ricci Hall is the only Catholic hostel in The University of Hong Kong. In early 1960, it was decided that space of Ricci Hall was inadequate; it should be renovated and rebuilt. On 8 December 1967, the extension of Ricci Hall was inaugurated.

Ricci Hall is a sports-oriented dorm intended primarily for undergraduate students.

History

Ricci Hall Residence is located at 93 Pok Fu Lam Road, is one of the oldest residential halls at the University of Hong Kong. It is a boys only hall, with great history and deep heritage.

Ricci Hall Residence was officially opened on 16 December 1929 and was established as a residence for students of the University of Hong Kong by the Jesuit Fathers. Located on Pokfulam Road, the Hall was a beautiful old style building with wonderful unobstructed view of the harbour.

It was mainly meant to accommodate Catholic students who came from the Wah Yan College, Hong Kong, Wah Yan College, Kowloon, La Salle College and St Joseph's College, Hong Kong.

Matteo Ricci was chosen as the Patron of the Hall. He is a Jesuit Father famous for his efforts to bring the West to China and China to the West. He is revered for his learning, for initiating a dialogue of cultures and for his knowledge of Chinese literature and philosophy.

In early 1960, it was decided that the space of Ricci Hall Residence was inadequate and it should be renovated and rebuilt. The renovation of the old block of Ricci Hall was completed in 1966, whereas construction of the new block on 8 December 1967.

Building features
Having five separate blocks connected together in order to foster communication among residents, Ricci Hall is unique in the architectural structure. There are total 120 single rooms with a balcony and 16 corridors. The facilities of Ricci Hall include a tennis court, a car park, a dining hall, two libraries, a billiard room, a chapel, a laundry, and 16 pantries at the end of each corridor.

Motto
Latin: Quantum potes tantum aude
English: As much as you are able, that you should dare to do
Chinese: 汝為君子儒 無為小人儒 (論語: 雍也編)

Emblem
Ricci Emblem originated from the emblem in the armour of St Ignatius of Loyola, the founder of the Society of Jesus. The shield in the emblem was divided obliquely: the wolf and hatchet on the right represents Loyola's family and symbolises generosity and hospitability. The helmet on top of the shield symbolises courage, courtesy, honour and spirit of sacrifice. The Latin sentence on the girdle beneath the shield is Ricci Motto.

Hall Colours
Maroon and White

Students' association 
All residents are members of Ricci Hall Students' Association Hong Kong University Students' Union (RHSA, HKUSU). The association was established in 1930. Tape Eric Wong is the first Chairperson of RHSA, HKUSU.

Activities

Our Lady Seat of Wisdom Chapel

Mass Schedule
Sunday Masses: 9:30 a.m., 12:30 p.m. (Cantonese), 11:00 a.m. (English)
Anticipated Sunday Masses: Saturday 5:45 p.m. (Cantonese)
Daily Masses: 7:30 a.m. (Cantonese)
Special Masses: First Friday 6:00 p.m. (Cantonese)

Ladies' Night
Ladies' Night is held in the late September. The residents dine ladies in Ricci Hall. Hall Tour will be organised after dinner for the sake of introducing Ricci Hall to ladies invited.

Gong Fight
Gong Fight is held by Ricci Hall and the only ladies residential hall: Lady Ho Tung Hall. Gong was used to remind residents the time in Lady Ho Tung Hall. In 1950s, the residents of Ricci Hall played a trick on the residents of Lady Ho Tung Hall by stealing the Gong. After the incident, two halls started to hold the Gong Fight during which the residents from Ricci Hall join together to "rob" the Gong against the water bomb attack by the residents of Lady Ho Tung Hall. This social activity is held in September and gathering between the residents of two halls follows after Gong Fight.

High Table Dinner
Being the tradition of Oxbridge colleges, High Table Dinner is one of the important functions of hall education. It provides residents with a formal platform to communicate with and be inspired by the graduates. The milk tea session when hall mates can have direct interaction with the guest of honour makes Ricci Hall's high table dinner special.

Social Gathering 
Social Gathering is one of the largest social activities held by the junior residents of Ricci Hall. The themes of the function vary years by years. The function acquaints the residents with more people having different backgrounds. Residents are equipped with etiquette through the function.

Annual Ball
Annual Ball is one of the grandest social activities of Ricci Hall. The preparation period lasts for a year and the funding exceeds 200 thousand dollars. Annual Ball symbolises the passing-on of knowledge from the old boys to the current and the experience of holding the Annual Ball crowns the current with pride and memories.

Champion Day
Champion Day is a special day for the residents to share their achievements of the year passed, in the aspects of sports cultural and services with others. Guests will be invited to present prizes. The picture of Champion Day is filled with laughter and tears.

Dragon Boat Race
The residents will participate in Dragon Boat Race in Dragon Boat Festival. After examinations, the residents can relax by joining the Dragon Boat Race which is one of the oldest traditions of Ricci Hall.

Wardens 
Some of the Ricci Hall wardens:
 Fr. Alfred Deignan (1970–1978)
 Fr. Russell (1978—1990)
 Fr. Alvaro Ribeiro (1990–1992)
 Fr. Robert Ng (1992–1997; 2011–2014)
 Rev. Fr. John Yong Tang (since 2014)

Prominent Old Boys
陳岡 Dr. John Tan Kang- Former Principal, Wah Yan College, Kowloon
張永霖 Mr. Linus Cheung Wing Lam – Ex-Chairman, Asia Television Limited
莊陳有 Mr. Chong Chan Yau – Director of Student Development, the University of Hong Kong
方津生 Dr. David Fang Jin Sheng – Prominent orthopaedic surgeon
方心讓 Sir. Harry Fang Sin Yang – Prominent orthopaedic surgeon
馮志強 Mr. Bosco Fung Chi Keung – Former Director, Planning Department, HKSAR
何鴻燊 Dr. Stanley Ho Hung Sun – Chairman, Shun Tak Group
何文匯 Prof. Richard Ho Man Wui – Founding Principal of CUTW Community College
許冠傑 Mr. Sam Hui Koon-kit – Prominent Singer, Actor and composer
林中麟 Mr. Bill Lam Chung Lung – CEO of Urban Renewal Authority
林祖輝 Mr. Lam Cho Fai – Prominent Artist
李柱銘 Mr. Martin Lee – Founding chairman (1994– 2002), the Democratic Party, Hong Kong
林雲峰 Prof. Bernard Lim Wan Fung – President of Hong Kong Institute of Architects (2006)
林子剛 Mr. Thomas Ling Chi Kong – Former Architects Registration Board chairman
吳錦祥 Dr. Stephen Ng Kam Cheung – Doctor, Specialist in Rehabilitation
陳瑋翔 Dr. Sam Chan Wai Cheung – Doctor, Specialist in Psychology
伍步謙 Dr. Ng Po Him – Chairman, Wing Lung Bank
蘇澤光 Mr. Jack, So Chak Kwong – Chairman of the Hong Kong Trade Development Council
蘇中平 Mr. Norman, So Chung Ping – Former Principal, Wah Yan College, Kowloon
孫明揚 Mr. Michael Suen Ming Yeung – Former Secretary for Education, HKSAR
施祖祥 Mr. Michael Sze Cho Cheung – Former chairman, the Hong Kong Trade Development Council
唐叔賢 Mr. David Tong Shuk Yin – Deputy President of City University of Hong Kong
謝孝衍 Mr. Aloysius Tse Hau Yin – Past President of Hong Kong Society of Accountants
黃澤恩 Dr. Greg Wong Chak Yan, JP – Past President of Hong Kong Institute of Engineers
黃霑 Dr. James Wong Jum Sum – Prominent Lyricist and composer
黃宏發 Mr. Andrew Wong Wang Fat – Former Chairperson, Legislative Council
鄔維庸 Dr. Raymond, Woo Wai Yung – Past National People's Congress local deputy
余叔韶 Mr. Patrick Yu Shuk-siu – The first local Chinese Crown Counsel
阮世生 Mr. James Yuen Sai Sang – Prominent Director
梁天琦 Mr. Edward Leung Tin-kei – Spokesman of Hong Kong Indigenous
陳南祿 Mr. Philip Chen Nan-lok – Businessman, Chief Executive Officer and later Deputy Chairman of Cathay Pacific, Executive Director of Swire Pacific, Chairman of Ocean Park, Chief Executive Officer of Hang Lung Group and Hang Lung Properties, Chairman of the Hong Kong Jockey Club
勞雙恩 – 偉門智威亞太區首席創意長兼創意委員會主席

See also
 List of Jesuit sites
Catholic university in Hong Kong

References

External links
Ricci Hall Official Webpage
Ricci Hall Facebook Page
Official YouTube Channel
Our Lady Seat of Wisdom Chapel Facebook Page
Sunday Mass Youtube Channel

University of Hong Kong
University residences in Hong Kong
Monuments and memorials in Hong Kong
Pok Fu Lam
Society of Jesus